The  Nuku Hiva rail (Gallirallus epulare) is an extinct species of flightless bird in the Rallidae, or rail family.

History
The rail was described in 2007 from subfossil bones collected in 1994-1995 by archaeologists B. V. Rolett, E. Conte and their colleagues at the Ha'atuatua archaeological site, on the island of Nuku Hiva in the Marquesas Islands of French Polynesia.  The site dates to about 1000 yr BP, from the early period of human settlement of the island.

Etymology
The specific epithet comes from the Latin epularis (pertaining to a banquet) which refers to the discovery of the specimens in a kitchen midden containing the remains of meals eaten by prehistoric Polynesians.

References

Nuku Hiva rail
Birds of the Marquesas Islands
Extinct flightless birds
Extinct birds of Oceania
Holocene extinctions
Late Quaternary prehistoric birds
Fossil taxa described in 2007
Nuku Hiva rail